Renewable energy in Thailand is a sector that is developing in Thailand. With its current rate of carbon emissions, Thailand must follow suit from its neighbors by cutting emissions down through the use of renewable energy. Several policies, such as the Eleventh Plan, set goals for renewable energy, such as biofuel implementation, in order to reduce the reliance of nonrenewable energy. For example, the use of biofuel can provide many benefits, such as reducing carbon emissions and reducing reliance on imported fuel. Some of the major renewable energy sources would be wind power, solar power, and biofuel. Improving governance over renewable energy is seen as an important measure to attract investment in renewables and widely deploy them throughout the country.

Renewable energy sources 
Total Renewable Energy Installed Capacity (May 2014)

Hydro energy

Solar energy 

Solar power in Thailand has been expanding since in 2011. Thailand was targeted to reach 55 MW by 2011. As of 2021, Thailand is seen as one of the most successful ASEAN countries in terms of developing solar energy.

Wind energy 

Wind power in Thailand amounts to an installed production capacity of 223 MW as of the end of 2013. Installed capacity was 112 MW by the end of 2012, with 111 MW added in 2013. This ranks Thailand 34th in the world by installed capacity.

Geothermal energy

See also
 Energy in Thailand
 Renewable energy by country

References

External links

 Thai Solar Energy Company